Genevieve Clark Thomson (November 30, 1894 – February 16, 1981) was an American suffragist.

Biography 

Genevieve Clark was born to politician and Speaker of the House James Beauchamp ("Champ") Clark and Genevieve Bennett Clark on November 30, 1894. She studied at the Friends' school in Washington, DC. 
She met publisher James M. Thomson during the Baltimore convention where she was working for her father's presidential nomination and Thomson was covering the event. They were married on June 30, 1915, in Bowling Green, Missouri. The whole state was invited.

As a suffragist, Thomson was an advocate of temperance and the Woman's Christian Temperance Union. In 1913, she became a reporter in Washington. In 1924, she announced her candidacy to fill H. Garland Dupre's Congressional seat on the United States House of Representatives for Louisiana's 2nd congressional district, based about New Orleans, Louisiana. She lost to J. Zach Spearing with Spearing earning 16,733 votes and Thomson 12,745.

References

External links 
 
 

1894 births
1982 deaths
American suffragists
20th-century American women
20th-century American people